Stephanie Seguino is a feminist professor of economics at the University of Vermont in Burlington, Vermont, United States. She was the president of the International Association for Feminist Economics from 2010 to 2011 and has also carried out research for both the United Nations and the World Bank.

Her research considers the effect of globalization on income distribution and well-being.

Education 
Seguino gained her doctorate in economics from American University in 1994.

Selected bibliography

Books

Journal articles 
 
 
 
  Pdf version - via the World Bank.

Papers 
  Pdf version.

Honours
Ailsa McKay Lecture, 2018

See also 
 Feminist economics
 List of feminist economists

References

External links 
 Work webpage The University of Vermont
 Personal webpage The University of Vermont
 Keynote Lecture 22nd FMM conference: Using fiscal and monetary policy to address intergroup inequality YouTube
 Graduate Student Lecture 22nd FMM conference: Intergroup inequality and macroeconomics YouTube

21st-century American economists
American University alumni
Date of birth missing (living people)
American development economists
Feminist economists
Living people
Macroeconomists
University of Vermont faculty
Year of birth missing (living people)
Presidents of the International Association for Feminist Economics